Leslie Maurice Smith (28 May 1900 – 12 January 1975) was an Australian rules footballer who played with Geelong in the Victorian Football League (VFL).

Smith, who Geelong acquired from Newtown, started out as a wingman and rover but played mostly as a defender during his league career. He was a regular in the Geelong team throughout the 1920s. In 1925 he was one of only five Geelong players to appear in all 19 games and was in the back pocket in their 1925 premiership side.

References

External links
 
 

1900 births
1975 deaths
Australian rules footballers from Victoria (Australia)
Geelong Football Club players
Geelong Football Club Premiership players
Newtown Football Club players
One-time VFL/AFL Premiership players